Ernest (1027 – 10 June 1075), known as Ernest the Brave (Ernst der Tapfere), was the Margrave of Austria from 1055 to his death in 1075. He was a member of the House of Babenberg.

Biography
He was born to Margrave Adalbert of Austria and his wife Frozza Orseolo, daughter of Doge Otto Orseolo of Venice. He increased the territory of his margraviate by amalgamating the Bohemian and Hungarian frontier marches up to the Thaya, March and Leitha rivers in what is today Lower Austria. In his time, the colonisation of the remote Waldviertel region was begun by his ministeriales, the Kuenring knights. 

Ernest received his epithet due to his fighting against King Béla I of Hungary and his son Géza I on behalf of their rival Solomon according to the chronicler Lambert of Hersfeld. In the commencing Investiture Controversy, he sided with King Henry IV of Germany and battled against the Saxons, dying at the Battle of Langensalza.

Marriage and children
In 1050 Ernest married Adelaide of Eilenburg (1030 – 26 January 1071), daughter of the Wettin margrave Dedi I of Lusatia, who gave him three children:
Leopold II, Margrave of Austria (1050–1095)
Justitia (d. 1120/1122), married Count Otto II of Wolfratshausen
Adalbert of Pernegg, Count of Bogen
In 1072 he secondly married Swanhild, daughter of Count Sighard VII in the Hungarian March.

See also
 List of rulers of Austria

References
Citations

Bibliography

External links

Ernst der Tapfere at AEIOU

1027 births
1075 deaths
11th-century margraves of Austria
Military personnel killed in action